Grayland Beach State Park is a public recreation area on the Pacific Ocean covering  along the southern edge of the census-designated community of Grayland in Pacific County, Washington. The state park offers camping, hiking, fishing, clamming, and beachcombing.

References

External links
Grayland Beach State Park Washington State Parks and Recreation Commission 
Grayland Beach State Park Map Washington State Parks and Recreation Commission

Parks in Pacific County, Washington
State parks of Washington (state)
Protected areas established in 1969